Mickey Trotman (21 October 1974 – 1 October 2001) was a football player from Trinidad and Tobago who played in the United States with the Dallas Burn, the Miami Fusion and the Rochester Rhinos, as well as representing the Trinidad and Tobago national football team. He died in a car crash in Port of Spain on 1 October 2001, at the age of 26.

Professional
In 1997, Trotman played several late season games with the New Orleans Riverboat Gamblers, a minor league team associated with the Dallas Burn.  In 1998, he moved to the Burn.

International career
Mickey made his international debut for Trinidad and Tobago on 6 May 1999, in a Friendly match against South Africa, scoring on his debut in the 24th minute. His most famous goal for T&T was in the 2000 CONCACAF Gold Cup Finals when he scored the Golden goal in the quarterfinals against Costa Rica to send T&T through to the semifinals. His last appearance for T&T before his death was a 2002 FIFA World Cup Qualification match against Mexico on 5 September 2001, when he came on as a 45th-minute substitute. His international career ended with 26 caps and 5 goals

Death
He died in a motor vehicle accident, along with his wife and brother.

References

External links
Caribbean Hall of Fame
 
 

1974 births
2001 deaths
Trinidad and Tobago footballers
Association football midfielders
Trinidad and Tobago international footballers
Trinidad and Tobago expatriate footballers
Expatriate soccer players in the United States
FC Dallas players
Miami Fusion players
New Orleans Riverboat Gamblers players
A-League (1995–2004) players
Rochester New York FC players
Joe Public F.C. players
Major League Soccer players
Road incident deaths in Trinidad and Tobago
University of Mobile alumni
TT Pro League players
2000 CONCACAF Gold Cup players